Sattleria pyrenaica is a moth in the family Gelechiidae. It was described by Petry in 1904. It is found in the Pyrenees and Basses-Alpes of Spain, Andorra and France.

References

Sattleria
Moths described in 1904